Uznezya (Üznezi) is a rural locality (a selo) and the administrative centre of Uznezinskoye Rural Settlement of Chemalsky District, the Altai Republic, Russia. The population was 501 as of 2016. There are 16 streets.

Geography 
The village is located on the right bank of the Katun River, 16 km north of Chemal (the district's administrative centre) by road. Anos is the nearest rural locality.

References 

Rural localities in Chemalsky District